Bourne End Railway Bridge is a railway bridge carrying the Marlow Branch Line, and a footpath over the River Thames in Bourne End, Buckinghamshire, England. It crosses the Thames on the reach between Cookham Lock and Marlow Lock.

The bridge was originally constructed in wood by Isambard Kingdom Brunel as part of the Wycombe Railway, opened in 1854 and operated in broad gauge until 1870. The narrow spans were unpopular with river traffic and the bridge was reconstructed in steel in 1895. A footbridge, cantilevered out from the railway bridge was added in 1992, to take the Thames Path across the river; this substitutes for the historical towpath crossing point at Spade Oak ferry, about 1 km upstream of the bridge.

In 2013, the bridge was restored and repainted in green, and a large number of rivets which had rusted away were replaced. The restoration took nearly a year to complete, being finished in December. There was a plan to electrify the line, but due to cost overruns during electrifying the GWR main line, this has apparently been postponed indefinitely.

See also
Crossings of the River Thames

References

Railway bridges in Berkshire
Railway bridges in Buckinghamshire
Pedestrian bridges across the River Thames
Bridges across the River Thames
Bridges completed in 1895
Cookham